Persoonia quinquenervis is a species of flowering plant in the family Proteaceae and is endemic to the south-west of Western Australia. It is an erect, spreading shrub with hairy young branchlets, twisted linear, lance-shaped, narrow oblong or narrow spatula-shaped leaves, and bright yellow flowers borne in groups of up to ten on a rachis up to  that continues to grow after flowering.

Description

Taxonomy
Persoonia quinquenervis was first formally described in 1842 by William Jackson Hooker in his Icones Plantarum from specimens collected in the Swan River Colony by James Drummond.

Distribution and habitat
This geebung grows in heath, thicket, woodland and forest in the area between Latham, Boyagin Nature Reserve, Tarin Rock, Frank Hann National Park and Yellowdine in the Avon Wheatbelt, Coolgardie, Esperance Plains, Geraldton Sandplains, Jarrah Forest, Mallee and Swan Coastal Plain biogeographic regions in the south-west of Western Australia.

Conservation status
Persoonia pungens is classified as "not threatened" by the Government of Western Australia Department of Parks and Wildlife.

References

quinquenervis
Flora of Western Australia
Plants described in 1842
Taxa named by William Jackson Hooker